Santo Giorgio is a Neoclassical-style, Roman Catholic church located on Piazza XXX Aprile, in the town Macerata, region of Marche, Italy.

History
A church at the site was present since the 13th century, but the present structure was erected in 1792-1798 by Cosimo Morelli. The classic façade (1842) with giant order pilasters and a triangular tympanum was designed by Agostino Benedettelli. The church is dedicated to Saints George, Stefano, and Martin of Tours. The interior houses a 16th-century wooden crucifix and a venerated icon of a Madonna della Salute attributed to Giovanni Battista Salvi, known as Sassoferrato, donated to the church in 1666.

References

18th-century Roman Catholic church buildings in Italy
Neoclassical architecture in le Marche
Roman Catholic churches in Macerata
Roman Catholic churches completed in 1798
Neoclassical church buildings in Italy